Daniel Nestor and Nenad Zimonjić were the defending champions but they competed with different partners that year, Nestor with Mark Knowles and Zimonjić with Julien Boutter.

Boutter and Zimonjić lost in the semifinals to Wayne Black and Kevin Ullyett.

Knowles and Nestor lost in the final 6–4, 3–6, 7–6(7–3) against Black and Ullyett.

Seeds

  Mark Knowles /  Daniel Nestor (final)
  Wayne Black /  Kevin Ullyett (champions)
  Julien Boutter /  Nenad Zimonjić (semifinals)
  Michael Hill /  David Prinosil (first round)

Draw

External links
 2002 Grand Prix de Tennis de Lyon Main Doubles Draw

Doubles
Doubles